Hannah Holgersson (born 1976) is a Swedish operatic soprano.

She was born in Höör, Skåne County, Sweden. In 2003, Holgersson made her opera début as Zerlina in Mozart’s Don Giovanni. In May 2004, she graduated from the Royal College of Music, Stockholm, receiving diplomas in voice performance and pedagogy. Her main professor during her years at the RCM was Christina Öqvist-Matton.

As a soloist, she has performed with orchestras including the Royal Philharmonic Orchestra, the Royal Opera Orchestra of Stockholm, the Drottningholm Baroque Orchestra and Kroumata (percussion-ensemble), with the Eric Ericson Chamber Choir, and with conductors such as Alan Gilbert, Siegfried Köhler and Laurence Reenes. She has also collaborated with the composers Ingvar Lidholm, Steve Dobrogosz and Kjell Perder.

Holgersson often produces her own concerts, both in Sweden and abroad. She is also a soloist on several CD-recordings. In addition to her career as a soloist, she also teaches singing. She also performed the 2007 Therion's album, Gothic Kabbalah, but not on the band's tour promoting the album.

Sources
Bain, Sara, Scottish Chamber Orchestra returns to DG One, Dumfries Standard, 11 December 2009
Kvällsposten, Sångerskan Hannah från Höör gör succé, 8 February 2010
Kosman, Joshua, Ligeti's comic-book Requiem, San Francisco Chronicle, 7 March 2009
Sveriges Radio, Hannah fick Östgöta Gilles stipendium, 3 December 2008

External links
 Official website of Hannah Holgersson

1976 births
Living people
People from Höör Municipality
Women heavy metal singers
Swedish operatic sopranos
Swedish heavy metal singers
Swedish sopranos
Therion (band) members
Royal College of Music, Stockholm alumni